Sanchai Ratiwatana and Sonchat Ratiwatana successfully defended their title, defeating Yuki Bhambri and Divij Sharan 7–6(7–3), 2–6, [10–6] in the final.

Seeds

Draw

Draw

References
 Main Draw

Beijing International Challenger - Doubles
2012 Men's Doubles